CBC Arts is the division of the Canadian Broadcasting Corporation that creates and curates written articles, short documentaries, non-fiction series and interactive projects that represent the excellence of Canada's diverse artistic communities. 

Some of the series and projects CBC Arts has produced include 21 Black Futures,  Art 101, Art Hurts, Big Things Small Towns, Canada's a Drag, The Collective, Crash Gallery, Exhibitionists, The Filmmakers, Interrupt This Program, The Move, Super Queeroes and The 2010s: The Decade Canadian Artists Stopped Saying Sorry.

CBC Arts has received considerable acclaim, winning multiple Canadian Screen Awards including for best talk show (The Filmmakers), non-fiction webseries (Canada's a Drag) and interactive production (Super Queeroes and The 2010s: The Decade Canadian Artists Stopped Saying Sorry). Staff members Amanda Parris and Peter Knegt both write Digital Publishing Award-winning weekly columns for the CBC Arts website that highlight Black and LGBTQ culture from a Canadian perspective, respectively. Other contributors to the website have included Kelsey Adams, Allysin Chaynes, Anne T. Donahue, Alicia Elliott, Samra Habib, Catherine Hernandez, Shawn Hitchins, Ben Lewis, Téa Mutonji, Owen Pallett, Casey Plett, Heath V. Salazar, Rae Spoon, Arielle Twist, Rinaldo Walcott, Joshua Whitehead and Michael Yerxa.

External links

Official website (French)
Facebook (English)
Facebook (French)
Twitter (English)
Twitter (French)

2015 establishments in Canada
Canadian art
Canadian entertainment websites
Canadian Broadcasting Corporation